Magnus Persson Atlevi (born 26 July 1965) is a Swedish professional golfer. He competed as Magnus Persson until his marriage to Elisabeth Atlevi in 1999.

Amateur career
As a golf prodigy, Persson became a scratch player at age 15, at the time the youngest ever in Sweden, and at 16 reached a +1 handicap, as one of just four players in the country. At just 15 years of age, Persson finished runner-up and low foreign contestant at the 1980 Orange Bowl International Junior Championship in Coral Gables, Florida, after winning a playoff for second place with Stephen Ames and Paul Way. The year after, he repeated his low foreign contestant finish at Orange Bowl, again after a playoff against Stephen Ames, and a total sixth place.

Persson won the European final of the 1981 Doug Sanders International Junior Championship, for players up to 18 years of age, at Royal Aberdeen Golf Club, Scotland.

His last year playing as an amateur, he qualified for the 1982 Open Championship at Royal Troon Golf Club, aged only 16. This year, he also won the amateur tournament Martini Cup at Rya Golf Club, Helsingborg, Sweden, with a 72-hole score 8 under par and the Swedish Junior Stroke-play Championship at the same course.

Persson was a member of the tied second-placed Sweden amateur team at the 1982 Eisenhower Trophy in Lausanne, Switzerland, in September. Persson made a four feet birdie putt at his 72nd hole to give Sweden a silver medal, shared with Japan, seven strokes behind United States.

At the end of 1982, he was named Swedish Golfer of the Year, male and female, by far the youngest player ever and the last time an amateur received the award.

Professional career
A sponsor agreement with car manufacturer Saab Automobile made it possible for Persson and two of his teammates from the 1982 Eisenhower Trophy, Ove Sellberg and Krister Kinell, to turn professional and form Team Saab, granted support and financial possibilities to compete on the European Tour. He successfully progressed through the 1982 European Tour Qualifying School, at La Manga, Spain, in November, finishing tied 7th and earned his first pay check. At the age of 17, he was the youngest player ever to win a European Tour card.

As a pro, he followed his 1982 Open Championship participation, by also qualifying the following three years, with a career best tied 39th finish in 1985. He would go on to start in The Open Championship totally eight times.

In 1986, he won the Swedish PGA Championship (that year named PGA Club Sweden Open) at a course, Lindö in Stockholm at Björn Borg Sports Club, designed 10 years earlier by his father Åke Persson, one of Sweden's most respected golf course architects at the time. Persson would go on to win the same title for a second time 24 years later, at 45 years of age.

Persson was twice a runner-up on the European Tour, losing in a sudden-death playoff on the sixth extra hole against Gordon Brand Jnr at the 1987 Scandinavian Enterprise Open on home soil in Stockholm, Sweden and also losing out in a playoff at the 1990 Open Renault de Baleares on Mallorca, Spain, to Seve Ballesteros. At the Mallorca tournament, Person led by five strokes before the last round and kept that lead with ten holes remaining, playing in the last group with Ballesteros. At the last hole Persson, still with a one-shot-advantage, found his ball plugged in a bunker, while Ballesteros' ball went playable despite a hooked drive into the gallery. Ballesteros went on to make a birdie and won the tournament in a sudden-death playoff.

1990 would become Perssons best season, finishing 30th on the European Tour Order of Merit. He lost his card at the end of the 1991 season and struggled to regain it the following years. In 2001, on his 11th visit to the Qualifying School Finals in as many years, Persson regained his European Tour card.

Persson won three times on the European Challenge Tour, the first title coming in the 1992 Perrier European Pro-Am at Brussels Golf Club, Belgium, the second in the 1993 Torneo Istantilla Golf, at Islantilla Golf Club, Huelva, Spain and the third in the 1998 Is Molas Challenge at Is Molas Golf Club in Sardinia, Italy.

In 2009, Persson became Tournament Director of the Swedish Golf Tour, at the time named the Nordea Tour. He also started to branch out into golf course design, having created one course in Sweden and one in Finland together with his architect father.

Persson also found interest in playing golf with hickory sticks and twice, 2012 and 2013, won the Swedish Hickory Championship.

Turning 50, Persson entered the 2015 Senior Tour Qualifying School. He had a European Senior Tour card in his grasp before he four-putted the final green for a double bogey, missing out by one shot. He secured his card for the 2016 European Senior Tour tying for third in the 2016 Senior Tour Qualifying School, having led the field after rounds two and three. Persson won the 2016 Paris Legends Championship and went on to finish second on the 2016 European Senior Tour Order of Merit, becoming Rookie of the Year. In 2018, he finished runner-up at the Staysure PGA Seniors Championship, the oldest important seniors tournament in Europe, before winning the European Tour Properties Senior Classic.

Amateur wins
1981 Flygt National Junior (Kalmar GC),  Doug Sanders International Junior Championship Europe
1982 Swedish Junior Stroke-play Championship, Martini Cup (Rya GC)
Sources:

Professional wins (14)

Challenge Tour wins (3)

Challenge Tour playoff record (0–1)

Nordic Golf League wins (2)

Swedish Golf Tour wins (2)

Sources:

Other wins (5)
1983 Gevalia Open
1984 Kvällsposten Masters
2009 Svalöv Open (Swedish Minitour)
2011 Guldpokalen (Swedish Minitour)
2013 Swedish PGA Club Pro Championship

European Senior Tour wins (2)

Playoff record
European Tour playoff record (0–2)

PGA Tour of Australasia playoff record (0–1)

Results in major championships

Note: Persson Atlevi only played in The Open Championship.

CUT = missed the half-way cut (3rd round cut in 1984 Open Championship)
"T" = tied

Team appearances
Amateur
European Boys' Team Championship (representing Sweden): 1980
Jacques Léglise Trophy (representing the Continent of Europe): 1980, 1981
European Youths' Team Championship (representing Sweden): 1981, 1982
St Andrews Trophy (representing the Continent of Europe): 1982 (winners)
Eisenhower Trophy (representing Sweden): 1982

Professional
Hennessy Cognac Cup (representing Sweden): 1984
Alfred Dunhill Cup (representing Sweden): 1988, 1989, 1990
World Cup (representing Sweden): 1983, 1984, 1990
Europcar Cup (representing Sweden): 1988 (winners)

References

External links

Swedish male golfers
European Tour golfers
European Senior Tour golfers
Sportspeople from Skåne County
People from Staffanstorp Municipality
1965 births
Living people